In control theory, it is often required to check if a nonautonomous system is stable or not. To cope with this it is necessary to use some special comparison functions. Class  functions belong to this family:

Definition: A continuous function  is said to belong to class  if:
 for each fixed , the function  belongs to  class kappa;

See also
 Class kappa function
 H. K. Khalil, Nonlinear systems, Prentice-Hall 2001. Sec. 4.4, Def. 4.3.

Control theory